The St John Street area is a residential area close to the city centre in Oxford, England. It consists of two streets, St John Street and Beaumont Buildings. Wellington Square is to the north, Pusey Street to the east, and Beaumont Street to the south.

It is an area of terraced houses developed in about 1830 as part of the same scheme as Beaumont Street.

References

Sources and further reading
 

Areas of Oxford
1830 establishments in England